Mogues is a commune in the Ardennes department in northern France.

Population

Notable people
 Lambert Closse,  Sergeant Major of the garrison of Ville-Marie, Canada, was born in Mogues in 1618.

See also
Communes of the Ardennes department

References

Communes of Ardennes (department)
Ardennes communes articles needing translation from French Wikipedia